Red Sorghum is a 1988 Chinese film about a young woman's life working in a distillery for sorghum liquor. It is based on the first two parts of the novel Red Sorghum by Nobel laureate Mo Yan.

The film marked the directorial debut of internationally acclaimed filmmaker Zhang Yimou, and the acting debut of film star Gong Li.  With its lush and lusty portrayal of peasant life, it immediately vaulted Zhang to the forefront of the Fifth Generation directors. The film won the Golden Bear Award at Berlin Film Festival.

Synopsis
The film takes place in a rural village in China's eastern province of Shandong during the Second Sino-Japanese War. It is narrated from the point of view of the protagonist’s grandson, who reminisces about his grandmother, Jiu'er. She was a poor girl who was sent by her parents into a pre-arranged marriage with an old man, Li Datou, who owned a sorghum wine distillery and who had leprosy.

As Jiu'er's wedding party crosses a field of sorghum, they are attacked by a bandit. One of the men hired to carry Jiu'er's sedan chair manages to fight off the assailant. After Jiu'er safely reaches the distillery, her rescuer, whom she has been eyeing during the trip, disappears. During Jiu'er's trip back to her parents' village, a bandit with a mask jumps out of the sorghum field and, after chasing down Jiu'er, carries her off into the sorghum stalks. Jiu'er runs away at first, but when the bandit takes off his mask and reveals himself to be her chair man and rescuer, she stops resisting his pursuit and has sex with him.

Upon Jiu'er's return to the distillery, it is discovered that Li Datou has died of mysterious causes, leading many of the distillery's workers to suspect murder. Nothing is proven, however, and since Jiu'er's late husband was without heir, it is she who takes ownership of the distillery, which has recently fallen on hard times. She inspires the workers to take new pride in their wine. One day, Jiu'er's lover and the narrator's grandfather becomes drunk and loudly insists to the group of men accompanying him that he is going to share her bed. When he enters the bedroom, however, she, embarrassed, tosses him out. The other men on the scene carry him away, sticking him in an empty wine vat where he remains for the next three days. Meanwhile, a group of bandits kidnap Jiu'er, forcing the distillery workers to pay a ransom for her freedom.

After emerging from the vat, the narrator's grandfather witnesses the worn down Jiu'er. The narrator's grandfather goes to confront the leader of the bandits, demanding to know whether the leader raped Jiu'er. The leader said he did not rape Jiu'er, because Jiu'er told the leader that she already slept with the disease-ridden old man Li Datou. The narrator's grandfather returns, but takes out his anger on the workers by urinating into four vats of liquor. To the clan's surprise, the urine somehow makes the liquor taste better than ever. Its product newly improved, the distillery begins to see financial success.

The War begins and Imperial Japanese Army troops invade the area. The Japanese soldiers then torture and kill Jiu'er's friend Luohan, a respected distillery worker. Jiu'er incites the workers to avenge his death. In the early dawn, they hide themselves in the sorghum field, prepared to ambush the Japanese military vehicles the moment they pass by. While waiting, however, the workers become distracted by hunger. When Jiu'er is informed of this by her young child (the narrator's father), she brings out some lunch for the workers. Arriving just as the Japanese soldiers do, Jiu'er is shot and killed in the chaotic skirmish that ensues, and the explosive traps meant for the Japanese trucks end up killing almost everyone at the scene. Only the narrator's grandfather and father manage to survive the encounter.

Cast
Gong Li as "My Grandma"
Jiang Wen as "My Grandpa"
Ji Chunhua as Sanbao the bandit chieftain
Teng Rujun as Uncle Luohan

Style
Like Zhang's later film, The Road Home (1999), Red Sorghum is narrated by the main characters' grandson, but Red Sorghum lacks the flashback framing device of The Road Home (the viewer never sees the narrator).

The cinematography by cinematographer Gu Changwei makes use of rich, intense colors. Zhang himself was a cinematographer prior to his directorial debut, and worked closely with Gu. The use of red showcases the rich vitality of the sorghum fields, as well as the director's personal style.

Reception
Upon its release, Red Sorghum garnered international acclaim, most notably winning the coveted Golden Bear at the 1988 Berlin International Film Festival.

Roger Ebert said, in his review and synopsis in Chicago Sun-Times, "There is a strength in the simplicity of this story, in the almost fairy-tale quality of its images and the shocking suddenness of its violence, that Hollywood in its sophistication has lost."

Awards
38th Berlin International Film Festival, 1988
Golden Bear Award
Hundred Flowers Awards, 1988
Best Feature
Golden Rooster Awards, 1988
Best Feature
Best Cinematography - Gu Changwei
Best Sound
Best Music - Zhao Jiping
Best Director - Zhang Yimou (nominated)
Best Actor - Jiang Wen (nominated)
Best Art Direction - Yang Gang (nominated)
Zimbabwe International Film Festival, 1988
Best Picture
Best Director - Zhang Yimou
Best Artistic Achievement
Sydney Film Festival, 1988
Film Critics Award
Brussels International Film Festival, 1989
Belgian French Radio Young Jury Award for Best Picture
Montreal World Film Festival, 1989
Silver Panda
Hong Kong International Film Festival, 1989
Top Ten Chinese Language Films
German Democratic Republic Filmmakers Award, 1990
Annual Award
Cuba Film Festival, 1990
Best Feature Film

Accolades 
Time Out 100 Best Chinese Mainland Films – #12

See also

 List of submissions to the 61st Academy Awards for Best Foreign Language Film
 List of Chinese submissions for the Academy Award for Best Foreign Language Film

Further reading
Mo Yan. Red Sorghum: A Novel of China. .

References

External links

Red Sorghum at the Chinese Movie Database

1987 films
1987 romantic drama films
1980s historical films
1980s war films
Chinese romantic drama films
Chinese historical films
Chinese war drama films
Films based on Chinese novels
Films directed by Zhang Yimou
Films set in the 1930s
Films set in Shandong
Golden Bear winners
Golden Rooster Best Film recipients
1980s Mandarin-language films
Second Sino-Japanese War films
Chinese historical romance films
1987 directorial debut films